Low hurdle races are a generally defunct form of track and field hurdle racing.  The event, generally run at or near a distance of 200 metres, was popular through 1960 at the international level.  After that, the IAAF stopped ratifying records in the 200 metres low hurdles and it became far less common.  United States high schools ran a shortened version of the race, the 180 yard low hurdles, until 1974, when most states and the NFHS converted to running the 330 yard low hurdles that with metrification evolved into the 300 meter intermediate hurdles, a shortened version of the international 400 metres hurdles.  Because the race occurred in a male dominated era, there was no common female equivalent of the race.  At the time the race lost its world record position, women were only occasionally running hurdles and when they did it was the 80 meter hurdles, over barriers the same height as the men's low hurdles.

The height of the low hurdles was 30 inches, otherwise referred to as 2 feet 6 inches or 76.2 centimetres.  It is the same height women now run for their long hurdles, generally the 400 metres hurdles.  The races were frequently run on a straightaway, necessitating tracks to be constructed with long "chutes" to accommodate the hurdles, the 200 metres straight and the single turn 400 metres or 440 yards.  These  tracks have been referred to as "panhandle tracks."  In large stadiums, where seating for football games was a primary consideration, these races started deep in a tunnel.

With lower hurdles, the race was much faster and less technical than the 110 metres hurdles, a race going over high hurdles, a foot (30 cm) higher.  Sprinters were able to change over to the low hurdles with success.  Jesse Owens once held the world record in the 200 meters and 220 yard low hurdles, set as part of the 1935 multiple world record day that was called the most impressive athletic achievement since 1850."

The last official world record holder in the event was Don Styron from Northeast Louisiana State University, whose 21.9 hand timed mark was set on April 2, 1960, in a dual meet against Louisiana State University.  The mark has lasted ever since.  Modern races use Fully Automatic Timing (FAT).  The fastest FAT time recorded is now 22.30 (with a wind of -0.6 mps) set on May 16, 2010 by Andy Turner set at the Manchester City Games in a specially arranged race, but using standard conversion, Styron's mark is still superior.   Turner beat a time of 22.55 by Olympian Laurent Ottoz of Italy in 1995.  Ottoz had bettered the automatic time of 22.63 by British Olympic medalist and multi-time World Champion Colin Jackson, who held the world record in the much more common 110 metre hurdles for almost 13 years.   The IAAF currently recognizes three records;  Styron as a hand timed mark on a straight, Turner as an automatically timed mark on a straight, and Ottoz as an automatically timed mark around a bend. 

The high school record in the 180 yard low hurdles dates to 1964 when three boys, Earl McCullouch from Long Beach Polytechnic High School,  Don Castronovo from Oceanside High School in Oceanside, New York and Steve Caminiti from Crespi Carmelite High School in Encino, California separately ran the 180 yard low hurdles at 18.1.  The record was never broken and the event was discontinued in regular high school competition ten years later in 1974.

Note:  The Low Hurdles (on the turn) were contested, at the girls high school level, in the state of Illinois until 1985.  The following are likely the fastest times recorded.

1984-85		Nicolle Thompson - East St. Louis (Lincoln) - :27.0

1983-84		Sametra King - Romeoville (H.S.) - :27.3

1981-82		Chris Crowther - Joliet (West) - :27.7

1980-81		Loretta Wiltgen - Country Club Hills (Hillcrest) - :27.9

1979-80		Gwen Brown - East St. Louis (Lincoln) - :28.0

Though no longer run in the United States, this race continues to be run in places such as Norway.

References

Hurdling
Athletics by type